The Gotham Independent Film Award for Best Screenplay is one of the annual Gotham Independent Film Awards. It was first presented in 2015 with Tom McCarthy and Josh Singer being the first recipients of the award for their work in Spotlight.

Winners and nominees

2010s

2020s

See also
 Academy Award for Best Original Screenplay
 Academy Award for Best Adapted Screenplay
 AACTA International Award for Best Screenplay
 BAFTA Award for Best Original Screenplay
 BAFTA Award for Best Adapted Screenplay
 Critics' Choice Movie Award for Best Screenplay
 Golden Globe Award for Best Screenplay
 Independent Spirit Award for Best Screenplay
 Independent Spirit Award for Best First Screenplay
 Writers Guild of America Award for Best Original Screenplay
 Writers Guild of America Award for Best Adapted Screenplay

References

Best Screenplay
Screenwriting awards for film
Awards established in 2015